Douglas is a settlement in Manitoba. It is located in the Rural Municipality of Elton.

References 

Unincorporated communities in Westman Region